Udayan Prasad (born Sevagram, 4 February 1953) is an Indian-born British television and film director. He is best known for his films Brothers in Trouble (1995) and My Son the Fanatic (1997), the latter based on a short story by Hanif Kureshi.

Life
Udayan Prasad was born in Sevagram, Maharashtra, India in 1953, and grew up on an ashram. He came to Britain when he was nine. He started studying archaeology at Birmingham University, but left to study graphic design at Leeds Polytechnic, where he started filmmaking.

Filmography

Film 

 Brothers in Trouble (1995)
 My Son the Fanatic  (1997)
 Gabriel & Me (2001)
 Opa! (2005)
 The Yellow Handkerchief  (2008)

Television 

 A Corner of a Foreign Field (1986, Channel 4)
 Indian or British or Both? (1986, ITV)
 Here Is The News (1989, BBC)
 102 Boulevard Haussmann (1990, BBC)
 They Never Slept (1991, BBC)
 Running Late (1992, BBC)
 Femme Fatale (1993, BBC)
 Talking Heads (1998, BBC): Playing Sandwiches 
 Silent Witness (2010, BBC): Intent
 The Tunnel (2013, Sky/Canal+) (two episodes)
 Selection Day (2018, Netflix)
  Becoming Elizabeth (2022, Starz)

Awards 
 1991: San Francisco International Film Festival Award in the category Golden Gate Award for Screen Two for the episode 102 Boulevard Haussmann 
 1992: BAFTA Award - nomination in the category Best Single Drama for Screen Two for the Episode 102 Boulevard Haussmann
 1993: San Francisco International Film Festival Award - nomination in the category Television Feature for Screen One for the episode Running Late 
 1995: Third place in the Emden International Film Festival in the category Emden Film Award for Brothers in Trouble
 1995: Thessaloniki Film Festival Award in the category Golden Alexander for Brothers in Trouble
 1997: Brussels International Film Festival Award - Nomination in the category Best European Feature for My Son the Fanatic
 1997: Dinard British Film Festival Award - Nomination in the category Golden Hitchcock for My Son the Fanatic 
 1999: BAFTA Awards - Nomination in the category Best Single Drama for Talking Heads 2 for the episode Playing Sandwiches
 2000: Independent Spirit Awards - Nomination in the category Best Foreign Film for My Son the Fanatic

References

External links 

 
 

1953 births
Living people
People from Maharashtra
English film directors
British television directors
British film directors
Indian emigrants to the United Kingdom